Three regiments of the British Army have been numbered the 106th Regiment of Foot:

106th Regiment of Foot (Black Musqueteers), raised in 1761
106th Regiment of Foot, raised in 1794
106th Regiment of Foot (Bombay Light Infantry), raised by the East India Company and placed on the British establishment as the 106th Foot in 1862